Ashmole may refer to:

Ashmole Bestiary
Ashmolean Museum
Bernard Ashmole
Elias Ashmole
Philip Ashmole
William Ashmole
Museum of the History of Science, Oxford, also referred to as the "Old Ashmolean Building"
Ashmole Academy, Southgate, London

See also
Ashmore
Ashmore (disambiguation)